is a Japanese surname. Notable people with the surname include:

, Japanese graphic artist who designed Pikachu
, Japanese business executive
, Japanese footballer
 Goro Nishida (1943–2014), Japanese mathematician
Hikaru Nishida (born 1972), Japanese singer and actress
, Japanese high jumper
, Japanese long-distance runner
Kitaro Nishida (1870–1945), Japanese philosopher, founder of the Kyoto School of philosophy
Makoto Nishida (born 1962), Japanese politician
, Japanese footballer and manager
Naomi Nishida (born 1972), Japanese actress
Nishida Shun'ei (born 1953), Japanese painter
, Japanese actor
, Japanese fencer
Shoji Nishida (born 1958), Japanese politician
Shuhei Nishida (1910–1997), Japanese pole vaulter
Takayuki Nishida (born 1977), Japanese long-distance runner
, Japanese shogi player
Tatsuo Nishida (1928–2012), Japanese  linguist
Toshisada Nishida (1941–2011), Japanese primatologist
Toshiyuki Nishida (born 1947), Japanese actor
, Japanese volleyball player

Japanese-language surnames